Surpost, the Suriname Postal Corporation, is the national post office of Suriname.

See also
Caribbean Postal Union
Postage stamps and postal history of Suriname

External links

Official website

Communications in Suriname
Suriname